is a Japanese light novelist best known for his series Kure-nai, which has been adapted into a manga in Jump SQ. and an anime. Kure-nai has three individual books illustrated by Yamato Yamamoto. Katayama won an honorable mention at the Super Dash Novel Rookie of the Year Awards in 2003 for his story Denpa teki na Kanojo.

Novels 
Denpateki na Kanojo
Denpateki na Kanojo ~Orokamono no Sentaku~
Denpateki na Kanojo ~Kōfuku Gēmu~
Kure-nai
Kure-nai ~Guillotine~
Kure-nai ~Shūakusai 1~
Kure-nai ~Shūakusai 2~

References

1973 births
Living people
20th-century Japanese novelists
21st-century Japanese novelists
Light novelists